Pseudodendromonadida is a subclass of bicosoecids, a small group of unicellular flagellates, included among the heterokonts.

Classification 
 Family Filidae Cavalier-Smith 2013
 Genus Filos Kim et al. 2010
 Family Nanidae Cavalier-Smith 2013
 Genus Nanum Cavalier-Smith, 2013
 Family Neradidae Cavalier-Smith 2006
 Genus Nerada Cavalier-Smith 2006
 Family Paramonadidae Cavalier-Smith 2006
 Genus Paramonas Kent 1881
 Family Siluaniaceae Karpov 1998
 Genus Adriamonas Verhagen et al. 1994
 Genus Siluania Karpov 1998
 Family Pseudodendromonadaceae Hibberd 1985
 Genus Pseudodendromonas Bourrelly 1953
 Genus Cyathobodo Petersen & Hansen 1961

References

External links 
 

Bikosea
Heterokont orders